Boyd Kane (born April 18, 1978) is a Canadian former professional ice hockey left winger who played in the National Hockey League (NHL). He most notably played over 1000 games in the American Hockey League (AHL), claiming three Calder Cups.

Playing career
Initially drafted 72nd overall in the 1996 NHL Entry Draft by the Pittsburgh Penguins, Pittsburgh failed to come to terms with Kane on a contract. He re-entered the draft in 1998 and was selected by the New York Rangers 114th overall. He split his first three professional seasons between the Hartford Wolf Pack of the American Hockey League and the Charlotte Checkers of the ECHL before finally earning a full-time spot with Hartford in 2001–02. Prior to the 2002–03 season, however, he was traded to the Tampa Bay Lightning for Gordie Dwyer, spending the season with the Springfield Falcons.

Kane signed with the Philadelphia Flyers in the off-season and while he played the majority of the 2003–04 season with the Philadelphia Phantoms, he played in his first seven NHL games with the Flyers. During the NHL Lockout he captained the Phantoms to a Calder Cup Championship.

After signing with the Washington Capitals in the off-season, he was sent down to the Hershey Bears where he was part of another run to a Calder Cup Championship.

He returned to Philadelphia in the off-season and made the Flyers final roster out of training camp prior to the 2006–07 NHL season. He was later sent down to the Phantoms.

On July 12, 2009, Kane signed to return with the Washington Capitals, primarily to reunited with the Hershey Bears of the AHL.

On July 3, 2013, Kane signed a one-year contract with Croatian club, KHL Medveščak Zagreb of the Kontinental Hockey League, re-uniting with former Hershey Bears head coach Mark French. In his 16th and final professional season in 2013–14, Kane in providing a veteran presence contributed with 4 goals and 9 points 48 games.

Career statistics

Awards and honours

References

External links

 

1978 births
Living people
B.C. Icemen players
Canadian expatriate ice hockey players in Croatia
Canadian expatriate ice hockey players in the United States
Canadian ice hockey left wingers
Charlotte Checkers (1993–2010) players
Hartford Wolf Pack players
Hershey Bears players
Ice hockey people from Saskatchewan
KHL Medveščak Zagreb players
New York Rangers draft picks
People from Swift Current
Philadelphia Flyers players
Philadelphia Phantoms players
Pittsburgh Penguins draft picks
Regina Pats players
Springfield Falcons players
Washington Capitals players